Joshua Santillan (born February 21, 1992) is a retired American pair skater who represents Switzerland. With skating partner Jessica Pfund, he is the 2015 Autumn Classic International bronze medalist and has competed at two Grand Prix events. They are the 2022 Swiss national champions.

Personal life 
Santillan was born on February 21, 1992, in Glendale, California. He enrolled at Colorado Christian University, taking online business courses.

Career

Early career 
Santillan began learning to skate in 1996. He teamed up with Olivia Oltmanns in September 2009. The pair's international debut took place in September 2010 at a Junior Grand Prix (JGP) event in Graz, Austria. Their best JGP placement, 7th, came in September 2011 in Riga, Latvia.

Oltmanns/Santillan moved up to the senior level in the 2014–15 season. They finished 11th at the 2015 U.S. Championships. Trudi Oltmanns coached the pair in Minnesota.

Partnership with Pfund 
Santillan teamed up with Jessica Pfund in May 2015, following tryouts in Florida and Colorado Springs, Colorado. They decided to be coached by Lyndon Johnston in Ellenton, Florida and, early in their partnership, also trained with Jim Peterson and Amanda Evora. Making their international debut, the pair won the bronze medal at the 2015 Autumn Classic International. Appearing as late replacements for Gretchen Donlan / Nathan Bartholomay, they finished 8th at their first Grand Prix event, the 2015 Skate America.

Pfund underwent surgery in mid-2016 due to two torn ligaments in her right foot and returned to the ice three months later. She and Santillan finished 8th at the 2016 Cup of China. Following the event, she had an amniotic stem cell injection to treat tendinitis in her anterior tendon and a bone cement injection for a chronic bruise in her talus bone. In January 2017, Santillan had a strained rotator cuff in his right shoulder. The pair placed 5th at the 2017 U.S. Championships.

In October 2020, Pfund and Santillan announced their intention to represent Switzerland in competition, but were told by the U.S. Figure Skating Federation that they would have to wait a year to be released. In July 2021, they announced they were allowed to represent Switzerland for the 2021-2022 season.

On March 18, 2022, they announced their retirement from competitive skating.

Programs

With Pfund

With Oltmanns

Competitive highlights 
GP: Grand Prix; CS: Challenger Series; JGP: Junior Grand Prix

Pairs with Pfund

For Switzerland

For the United States

Pairs with Oltmanns

Men's singles

References

External links 
 
 

1992 births
American male pair skaters
Living people
People from Glendale, California
21st-century American people